Raudonė Castle is a residential castle (estate, manor) of the 19th century in Raudonė, Lithuania. Today it is used as a public school.

History 
Bayersburg II Castle, an old Teutonic castle, stood here until the 16th century. The original castle is the setting of an East Prussian legend known as "The White Maiden of the Bayersburg". Raudonė was a royal manor, which Grand Duke Sigismund II August gave to Prussian merchant Krispin Kirschenstein. He built a Renaissance style manor house with a  cylindrical tower on the grounds of the old castle at the end of the 16th century.

The 18th century owners of the Raudonė estate, the Olędzki (Olendzki) h. Rawicz family, members of Polish nobility, commissioned Laurynas Stuoka-Gucevičius \ Wawrzyniec Gucewicz to renovate the castle. The next owner, the Russian Prince Platon Zubov, acquired the estate in the first half of the 19th century and his family transformed the castle yet again. Their architect was Cesare Anichini. The Neo-Gothic style building was built in 1877 as part of the castle building complex. It was used as a warehouse and a living place for servants. In 1923, the building was turned into mill. Today the whole complex is an example of 19th-century Neo-Gothic architecture. The last owners of the castle from 1898 to 1937, was Sophia Waxell, a granddaughter of Sophia von Pirch-Kaiserov who was niece of Platon Zubov, and her husband from Madeira, José Carlos de Faria e Castro. After early death of Sophia, the castle belonged to her husband, later on to her only son, Joseph Carlo de Faria e Castro and his wife Olga Kordashevski and their children Nikolai, Vladimir and Alexander. In 1937 the castle became property of the National Bank of Lithuania.

The castle is surrounded by an old park, in which rare trees grow: the silver fir, Swiss pine, grey walnut, line with nine trunks, Gediminas Oak. The Gediminas Oak, under which according to a legend the Grand Duke of Lithuania Gediminas had a lunch, is no longer putting out leaves. The tower is open to public as an observation tower of Nemunas valley.

Gallery

See also

 List of castles in Lithuania

References
 Urban, William. The Teutonic Knights: A Military History. Greenhill Books. London, 2003, p. 133. 
 Polski słownik biograficzny / komitet redakcyjny Władysław Konopczynski ... [et al.]. Publisher Kraków : Skład główny w ksieg. Gebethnera i Wolffa, 1935-. (set)

Castles in Lithuania
Gothic Revival architecture in Lithuania
Buildings and structures in Tauragė County
Tourist attractions in Tauragė County